Peplidium is a genus of flowering plants belonging to the family Phrymaceae. Its native range is Egypt to Sinai, Indian subcontinent, and Australia.

The genus was first described by Alire Raffeneau Delile in 1813.

Species
Species:

Peplidium aithocheilum 
Peplidium foecundum 
Peplidium maritimum 
Peplidium muelleri

References

Phrymaceae
Lamiales genera
Taxa named by Alire Raffeneau Delile
Plants described in 1813